Richard P. Rosenthal is an American author and law enforcement officer.  In 2011, he retired as the chief of police of Wellfleet, Massachusetts on Cape Cod, where he served for over 20 years. Prior, he served two decades as an NYPD officer, retiring at the rank of lieutenant.

Rosenthal has written two books on police work, one on "skycops" and one on K-9 units, as well as a novel and a memoir about police undercover work. He is the 100th writer to have been added to Police-Writers.com, a website dedicated to police officers turned authors.

As a rookie cop for the NYPD,  he was assigned to work undercover in the JDL; it is the subject of his fourth book.

Books
 1992: Murder of Old Comrades, (novel) With Amy Rosenthal. Eric Tobias, ed. Pocket Books. .  .
 1994: Sky Cops: Stories from America's Airborne Police.  With Amy Rosenthal. Pocket Books. .  .
 1997: K-9 Cops: Stories from America's K-9 Police Units.   Pocket Books. , .
 2000: Rookie Cop: Deep Undercover in the Jewish Defense League. (memoir) Leapfrog Press. ,  .
 2014: Practical Handgun Training Amazon.com..
 2014: Self-Publishing Simplified! Amazon.com. .

References

Living people
Year of birth missing (living people)
People from Wellfleet, Massachusetts
Writers from New York City
American police chiefs
American male writers